David Patrikarakos is a British journalist, author and TV producer, best known as the author of War in 140 Characters: How Social Media Is Reshaping Conflict in the Twenty-First Century.

Background 

Patrikarakos was born in Hampstead and attended University College School. He has been described as a British-Greek-Jewish-Iranian-Iraqi. Via his father, he is descended from the Greek revolutionary leader and statesman Georgios Sisinis, while his mother's side includes a long line of Sephardi rabbis including Abdallah Somekh, who codified kosher laws for Baghdadi Jews throughout India and the Far East, and the de facto chief Rabbi of Babylon, Yosef Hayyim. Patrikarakos's great-grandfather, Reuben Somekh was Member of Parliament for Basra under the British Mandate in Iraq. Sylvia Kedourie and Elie Kedourie were also cousins. Patrikarakos has written about growing up as the child of exiles, for whom London was not just a home but a "refuge."

Author 
After post-graduate studies at Wadham College, Oxford, in 2012 Patrikarakos published Nuclear Iran: Birth of An Atomic State, a full history of Iran's nuclear ambitions. Nuclear Iran was named as a New York Times Editor's Choice and nominated for the 2013 Total Politics Book Awards.

His second book, War in 140 Characters: How Social Media Is Reshaping Conflict in the Twenty-First Century, drew from Patrikarakos' time embedded with forces in the Russian-Ukraine conflict and reporting on the 2014 Hamas-Israel conflict, Operation Protective Edge and ISIS, to explore the increasing role played by social media in modern conflict. It was also the first book to explore the work of Eliot Higgins and Bellingcat, who would gain prominence following the 2018 poisoning of Sergei and Yulia Skripal. On its publication in 2018, Patrikarakos' book was widely reviewed in the international press, including by Ben Judah in The Times, who wrote that "War in 140 Characters should be mandatory reading at Sandhurst". In the book, Patrikarakos uses the concept of what he terms Homo Digitalis, the individual that (thanks to the digital revolution, especially social media) is networked, globally connected, and able to wield disproportionate power.

In the military sphere, War in 140 Characters was placed on the reading lists for the Munich Security Conference and the UK's Royal Air Force Centre for Air Power Studies and singled out as essential reading by Admiral Foggo at an October 2018 meeting of the Atlantic Council. In January 2018, the incoming head of UK Chief of the Defence Staff, Sir Nick Carter concluded his first major policy speech at Royal United Services Institute by calling on the 77th Brigade to observe the lessons of Patrikarakos' book.

Journalist 
Patrikarakos started writing on foreign affairs, primarily on Iran, before branching out to cover the Middle East and post-Soviet states more generally, specialising in disinformation. In the course of his career he has written for The New York Times, Financial Times, Wall Street Journal, Newsweek, The Guardian, Daily Telegraph, The Independent, The Spectator, Foreign Policy, The New Republic, Prospect, New Statesman, Politico, Times Literary Supplement, London Review of Books, Reuters, Mashable, Literary Review, CNN, and The National Interest, among others.

References 

British male journalists
British military writers
British technology writers
British technology journalists
British political journalists
British Jews
British people of Greek descent
Journalists from London
Year of birth missing (living people)
Living people
Alumni of Wadham College, Oxford
Yale University fellows
Academics of the University of St Andrews